Boris Yeliozovich Chochiev (Russian: Борис Елиозович Чочиев; ; 1 November 1957 – 22 July 2021) was a South Ossetian politician who briefly served as Prime Minister in 2008.

Biography
Chochiev became Prime Minister on 18 August 2008, after South Ossetian President Eduard Kokoity had dismissed the former government and proclaimed a state of emergency. On 22 October 2008, the South Ossetian parliament appointed Aslanbek Bulatsev as new Prime Minister. 

Before becoming Prime Minister, Chochiev served as first deputy minister, as well chief negotiator for the South Ossetian secessionist government. Chochiev was also a member of the Joint Control Commission.

Death
Chochiev died from COVID-19 on 22 July 2021, in Vladikavkaz. He was 63 years old.

References

1957 births
2021 deaths
People from Tskhinval district
Communist Party of the Soviet Union members
Prime Ministers of South Ossetia
Deaths from the COVID-19 pandemic in Russia